Gayan Sirisoma (born 22 September 1981) is a Sri Lankan cricketer. He made his first-class debut in the 2002–03 season and has played more than 100 matches.

References

External links
 

1981 births
Living people
Sri Lankan cricketers
Antonians Sports Club cricketers
Badureliya Sports Club cricketers
Bloomfield Cricket and Athletic Club cricketers
Galle Cricket Club cricketers
Kalutara District cricketers
Lankan Cricket Club cricketers
Panadura Sports Club cricketers
Sebastianites Cricket and Athletic Club cricketers
Tamil Union Cricket and Athletic Club cricketers
People from Ambalangoda